Laïsa Lerus (born 7 August 1975 in Les Abymes, Guadeloupe) is a French handball player who competed at the 2000 Summer Olympics .

References

External links
  sports reference Laïsa Lerus
 Laïsa LERUS | profil joueur

French female handball players
French people of Guadeloupean descent
1975 births
Olympic handball players of France
Handball players at the 2000 Summer Olympics
Living people